Christine Young Jones (born October 13, 1943) is an American actress.

Personal life
Jones is the daughter of Robert Terry Jones and Jane Rickey. She is one of four children. Jones is the granddaughter of Branch Rickey, the president of the Brooklyn Dodgers who signed Jackie Robinson. Jones graduated from Elmira College. She married Thomas Lipscomb on August 22, 1981.

Career

Primetime TV and film 
Jones first appeared in the 1975 film Cooley High, and later the TV series City of Angels ("Palm Springs Answer," 1976) and Serpico ("The Deadly Game," 1976). She also appeared in Woody Allen's Annie Hall in 1977 as Dorrie, and in Stealing Home as Grace Chandler in 1988. Other film appearances include Wild Thing (1987), Minotaur (1997) and Gang of Roses (2003).

Jones portrayed Sarah Jackson in the 1993 CBS miniseries Queen, and appeared  on shows including A Man Called Hawk ("Hear No Evil," 1989), Lifestories: Families in Crisis ("The Secret Life of Mary Margaret: Portrait of a Bulimic," 1992), Law & Order ("Burden," 1998), Law & Order: Criminal Intent ("The Third Horseman," 2002; "Monster," 2003), Now and Again ("Fire and Ice," 2000) and Third Watch ("Just Another Night at the Opera," 2000). Jones also appeared as Fey Sommers (in flashbacks) on the ABC series Ugly Betty in 2006.

Daytime  
Jones is also known for her work on several daytime operas. 

She portrayed the unhinged Janice Frame on the NBC soap opera Another World from 1978 to 1980, and again in 1989. That role was her second appearance on the show; she had appeared as Amy Gifford in 1977, a character that was then sent to sister soap Lovers and Friends.

In 1981, Jones played Victoria Lord on One Life to Live when actress Erika Slezak was on maternity leave, returning again for one episode in 1983. Jones later portrayed Pamela Stuart on One Life to Live from 1985 to 1987, making returns in 1988, 2001 (for one of Asa Buchanan's fake funerals, right after playing the unnamed socialite who dumped David Vickers as her "kept man"), 2008, and a final appearance in 2009, when her character was murdered. Jones had a long association with, and ultimately played three roles on the show (including nurse Sheila Rafferty in 1975 and 1976).

Other daytime appearances include Catsy Kirkland on Ryan's Hope from 1982 to 1983 and Christina Robertson on Rituals from 1984 to 1985. She also filled in for Jane Elliot as General Hospital Tracy Quartermaine in 1989.

Filmography

References

External links

Place of birth missing (living people)
Living people
American film actresses
American soap opera actresses
American television actresses
21st-century American actresses
Year of birth missing (living people)